Geranylgeranyl diphosphate reductase (geranylgeranyl reductase, CHL P) is an enzyme with systematic name geranylgeranyl-diphosphate:NADP+ oxidoreductase. This enzyme catalises the following chemical reaction

 phytyl diphosphate + 3 NADP+  geranylgeranyl diphosphate + 3 NADPH + 3 H+

This enzyme also acts on geranylgeranyl-chlorophyll a.

References

External links 
 

EC 1.3.1